L'anello di Siva is a 1914 Italian film directed by Augusto Genina.

External links

1914 films
Italian silent films
Films directed by Augusto Genina
Italian black-and-white films